Jostedalen is a river valley in Luster Municipality in Vestland county, Norway. The valley is deep, but the valley floor lies over long stretches of flat river plains interrupted by steep steps. In the north, the landscape gets pretty wild. The Jostedalsbreen National Park surrounds the valley, which brings a lot of tourism to the area. The Nigardsbreen glacier is also accessible from the valley.

Historically, most of the valley was part of the old municipality of Jostedal from 1838 until its dissolution in 1963 when it was merged into Luster Municipality.

Name
The Old Norse form of the name was probably . The first element is then the genitive of Jastra (the old name of the river Jostedøla) and the last element is dalr which means "valley" or "dale". The river name is probably derived from jǫstr which means "yeast". The water in the river comes from glaciers, and in summer time the river gets "frothy" or "foamy" due to all of the melting ice and the many waterfalls.

Transportation
The route through Jostedal, Norwegian highway 604, brings one directly to the foot of Nigardsbreen, a tongue of Jostedalsbreen glacier and the museum Breheimsenteret. There is also a bus connection to the glacier in summer.

The road through Jostedalen offers some of the most magnificent views of the Norwegian fjord landscape with towering mountains and spectacular waterfalls. At the end of the road is the breath-taking sight of the blue ice at the mouth of the Nigardsbreen glacial tongue.

Geography
The Jostedalen valley empties into the Gaupnefjord at the village of Gaupne. The Gaupnefjord is an arm of the Lustrafjorden, which is an arm of the famous Sognefjord, the second largest fjord in the world. There are three major glacial lakes in the area: Tunsbergdalsvatn, Nigardsbrevatn, and Styggevatn (vatn is Norwegian for lake). Other lakes in Jostdedal include Austdalsvatnet and Styggevatnet.

Jostedalsbreen National Park and Breheimen National Park are located on either side of the Jostedalen valley.

Farms of Jostedalen
Historically, and still occurring in present times, when owners of farms are no longer young enough to operate the farm, the title is either passed down to a younger family member or sold to a neighbour. Traditionally, the new operators of the farm assume the farm name as their new surname, and are often burdened with caring for the previous owners as part of the sale or transfer of title.

Most of the farms near the village of Jostedal have been in operation for centuries:

References

External links

https://web.archive.org/web/20080706032251/http://www.jostedal.com/ 

Luster, Norway
Valleys of Vestland